Wilhelmus Christiaan Franciscus "Willy" van Bladel (born 26 March 1960 in Eindhoven) is a sailor from the Netherlands, who represented his country at the 1984 Summer Olympics in Los Angeles. With Huub Lambriex as crew, Van Bladel took the 11th place in the Tornado. At the 1988 Olympics in Pusan Van Bladel made his second appearance in the Olympic regattas with his brother Cees van Bladel as crew. They took 9th place.

Sailing career
After sailing Vaurien and 470 with his brother Cees van Bladel Van Bladel then moved into the Tornado.

Professional life
Van Bladel studied BBA, Business Administration at the Nyenrode University (1978–1981). He nowadays is owner of the company Hoblad b.v..

Since 2007, Wil is head coach of the Flemish Olympic team (VYF). He is the primary coach of Evi Van Acker.

References

Sources
 
 
 
 
 
 
 
 
 
 
 
 
 
 
 
 
 
 
 
 

1960 births
Living people
Sportspeople from Eindhoven
Dutch male sailors (sport)
Sailors at the 1984 Summer Olympics – Tornado
Sailors at the 1988 Summer Olympics – Tornado
Olympic sailors of the Netherlands
Vaurien class sailors
20th-century Dutch people